The following tables show the extent of impact of the 2019–20 Australian bushfire season.

List of fires of the 2019–20 Australian bushfire season

Impact to towns of the 2019–20 Australian bushfire season

Impact to National Parks of the 2019–20 Australian bushfire season

Sources

External links 

 NSW Rural Fire Service - Major Fire Updates
 ArcGIS - Aggregated view of National Bushfire Boundaries

2019 in Australia
2020 in Australia